The 17th Lambda Literary Awards were held in 2005 to honour works of LGBT literature published in 2004.

Special awards

Nominees and winners

External links
 17th Lambda Literary Awards

Lambda Literary Awards
Lambda
Lists of LGBT-related award winners and nominees
2005 in LGBT history
2005 awards in the United States